Vetluzhsky Uyezd (Ветлужский уезд) was one of the subdivisions of the Kostroma Governorate of the Russian Empire. It was situated in the northeastern part of the governorate. Its administrative centre was Vetluga.

Demographics
At the time of the Russian Empire Census of 1897, Vetluzhsky Uyezd had a population of 120,836. Of these, 98.2% spoke Russian and 1.6% Mari as their native language.

References

 
Uezds of Kostroma Governorate
Kostroma Governorate